Blesna Peak is the ice-covered peak of elevation 1261 m in the northeast part of Stribog Mountains on Brabant Island in the Palmer Archipelago, Antarctica.  It surmounts Paré Glacier to the west and north, and Laënnec Glacier to the southeast. The peak is named after the medieval fortress of Blesna in Southern Bulgaria.

Location
It underwent British mapping in 1980 and again in 2008.

References

External links
 Blesna Peak on USGS website
 Blesna Peak on SCAR website
 Blesna Peak. Copernix satellite image

Maps
 Antarctic Digital Database (ADD). Scale 1:250000 topographic map of Antarctica. Scientific Committee on Antarctic Research (SCAR). Since 1993, regularly upgraded and updated.
British Antarctic Territory. Scale 1:200000 topographic map. DOS 610 Series, Sheet W 64 62. Directorate of Overseas Surveys, Tolworth, UK, 1980.
Brabant Island to Argentine Islands. Scale 1:250000 topographic map. British Antarctic Survey, 2008.

Mountains of the Palmer Archipelago
Bulgaria and the Antarctic